Volumizer is 2 Skinnee J's second major-label album. It was originally completed and set to be released on September 12, 2000 through Capricorn Records. However, once Capricorn was absorbed by Volcano Records, Volumizer was shelved. The album was finally released in April, 2002, with songs on the original track listing cut (including original single "Stockholm Love," which was released on CD singles in 2000), and new songs added.

The song "3 Minutes" was used as the entrance theme for former WWE tag team 3-Minute Warning, a team consisting of wrestlers Matt "Rosey" Anoa'i and Eddie "Jamal" Fatu. A music video was shot for the song and single, "Grown Up," featuring comedian Andy Dick. Following poor album sales, 2 Skinnee J's were dropped from Volcano Records.

Track listing

References

2000 albums
2 Skinnee J's albums
Capricorn Records albums
Albums produced by Mickey Petralia